Yan may refer to:

States
 Yan (state) (11th century – 222 BC), a major state in northern China during the Zhou dynasty
 Yan (Han dynasty kingdom), first appearing in 206 BC 
Prince of Yan title held in various dynasties of China 
 Yan (Three Kingdoms kingdom), from 190 to 238 
 Former Yan (337–370), Xianbei state in present-day Hebei 
 Western Yan (384-394), Xianbei state in present-day Shanxi 
 Later Yan (384–407), Xianbei state during Sixteen Kingdoms Period 
 Southern Yan (398-410), Xianbei state in present-day Shandong 
 Northern Yan (407-436), successor of Later Yan  
 Yan (An–Shi) (756–763), a rebel state founded by the An-Shi Rebellion
 Yan (Five Dynasties period) short-lived state in Hebei from 911 to 913

Names
 Yan (surname), romanization for several Chinese surnames
 Yan, a Cantonese transcription of surname Zhen (甄)
 Yan, a transliteration of the name  "Ян" (Jan) from the Russian language

People
 Yan Emperor, a legendary emperor of ancient China
 Yan, Marquis of Tian (died c. 370 BC), 4th-century BC ruler of the state of Qi
 Yan (musician) or Jan Scott Wilkinson, English singer-songwriter
 Jacob Mikhailovich Gordin or Yan (1853–1909), Ukrainian-American Yiddish-language playwright
 Yan Zhu, software developer
 Yan (footballer, born 1997), Brazilian footballer

Places
 Yan, a historic village of the Haida people of Queen Charlotte Islands in what is now British Columbia, Canada
 Yan Mountains, a mountain range in north China
 Yan, Iran, a village in South Khorasan Province, Iran
 Yan, Kedah, a district in Malaysia

Other uses
 Yan Lifts, commonly known name for Lift Engineering, aerial chairlift manufacturing company which ceased operation in 1996

People with the given name
 Yan Gaylit (1894–1938), Soviet corps commander
 Yan Karlovich Berzin (1889–1938), Soviet military commander and politician
 Yan Klukowski (born 1987), English professional footballer
 Yan Rudzutak (1887–1938), Bolshevik revolutionary and a Soviet politician

See also
 Yeast assimilable nitrogen, the combination of free amino nitrogen, ammonia and ammonium for fermenting wine
 Youth Action Network, a former UK volunteering organisation